The 1970 Amateur World Series was held in Cartagena, Colombia from November 18 through December 4, 1970. It was the first Amateur World Series in over 30 years to feature a European team and was the first to include two European teams. While both won a game, the newcomers clearly struggled; within 35 years, both will have made it to the Medal round.

Final standings

References

Baseball World Cup, 197
Baseball World Cup
1970
Amateur World Series
Amateur World Series
Amateur World Series
Sport in Cartagena, Colombia